Krvavčji Vrh is a village in the Municipality of Semič in Slovenia. It lies on the local road leading east out of Semič to Metlika. The area is part of the historical region of Lower Carniola. The municipality is now included in the Southeast Slovenia Statistical Region. 

The local church is dedicated to Saint Florian and belongs to the Parish of Semič. It is a 16th-century building that was refurbished in the Baroque style in the 18th century.

References

External links
Krvavčji Vrh at Geopedia

Populated places in the Municipality of Semič